Yuji Yoshimi (吉見 祐治, born May 21, 1978 in Wakayama, Wakayama) is a Japanese former professional baseball pitcher in Japan's Nippon Professional Baseball. He played with the Yokohama BayStars from 2001 to 2010 and for the Chiba Lotte Marines from 2010 to 2013. He also played for Team Japan at the 2000 Olympics.

External links

Sports-Reference.com/Olympics
NBP

1978 births
Living people
Baseball people from Wakayama Prefecture
Nippon Professional Baseball pitchers
Yokohama BayStars players
Chiba Lotte Marines players
Baseball players at the 2000 Summer Olympics
Olympic baseball players of Japan